Till Death Unites Us is the fourth full-length studio album by the Finnish melodic death metal band Norther. It was released on 25 January 2006 through Spinefarm Records. The album has no cover song, while most other Norther releases include such a song; this release marks their first studio album to not include a cover song. The song "Scream" was released as a CD single.

Track listing

(These tracks are taken from Solution 7.)

Charts

Credits

Band members
 Petri Lindroos − vocals, guitar
 Kristian Ranta − guitar, vocals (on 6,9,11)
 Toni Hallio − drums
 Jukka Koskinen − bass
 Tuomas Planman − keyboards, synthesizers

Production
 Recorded and mixed at Studio Fredman in Gothenburg, Sweden from July to September 2005.
 Mastered at Chartmaker Studios in Helsinki, Finland in November 2005 by Svante Forsback.
 Design and illustrations by Killustrations.com

References

External links
 Information on the recording studio found in an interview with Petri Lindroos and Jukka Koskinen.

2006 albums
Norther albums
Albums produced by Fredrik Nordström